Lyudmyla and Nadiia Kichenok defeated Nicole Melichar-Martinez and Laura Siegemund in the final, 7–5, 4–6, [10–7] to win the doubles tennis title at the 2022 Tallinn Open.

This was the first edition of this event.

Seeds

Draw

Draw

References

External links
Main draw

Tallinn Open - Doubles